Heated is the third album by Sean T. It was released on September 9, 2000 for his own label Get Gone Records and was entirely produced by Sean T.

Track listing
"Intro" - :56 
"Hataz" - 4:11 (Featuring San Quinn, Re-Act) 
"In Yo Look" - 3:57 (Featuring Spice 1, Crime Boss)
"Cameras" - 2:30 
"Heated" - 3:32 
"Real Mcee's" - 3:54 
"In the Hood" - 4:19 (Featuring Papoose)
"We Don't Listen" - 3:53  (Featuring Tuff)
"Gangsta" - 3:26 
"Sean Gotti" - 3:31 
"All Night" - 3:57 
"Out" - 3:53 
"We Ride" - 3:32 
"Get Gone 2K" -  4:23 
"Bomb 1st" - 3:33 
"When I C U" - 4:30 (Featuring B-Legit)
"What U Wanna" - 3:09 
"Livin'" - 3:58 
"Save the Drama" - 4:07 (Featuring JT the Bigga Figga, San Quinn)

References

2000 albums
Sean T albums